Iberocypris palaciosi or Squalius palaciosi is a species of cyprinid fish. It is endemic to Spain where it is known with the name bogardilla.

Iberocypris palaciosi is only known from two tributaries of the Guadalquivir river, from a total stretch of less than 100 km. It is threatened by habitat loss and considered critically endangered. No records of the species have been made recently in fish surveys.

Sources

Leuciscinae
Endemic fauna of Spain
Freshwater fish of Europe
Fish described in 1980
Taxonomy articles created by Polbot